William Byron Colver (September 26, 1870 - May 28, 1926) was chairman of the Federal Trade Commission and general editorial director of the Scripps‐Howard newspapers.

Biography
He was born on September 26, 1870, in Wellington, Ohio to Byron Henry Colver. He married Pauline Simmons.

During the Russo-Japanese War, he served as a war correspondent in Manchuria.

He died on May 28, 1926, in Washington, DC.  His widow died in 1964.

References

External links
 

1870 births
1926 deaths
Federal Trade Commission personnel
People from Wellington, Ohio
Woodrow Wilson administration personnel